Forest Hill Community High School (FHCHS) also known as Forest Hill or The Hill, is a coeducational public high school in West Palm Beach, Florida with an enrollment of 2,457 students. The school is a part of the School District of Palm Beach County.

History 

The school opened as Forest Hill High School in 1959; it is situated next to the West Palm Beach Country Club and I-95 in the southwestern corner of the City of West Palm Beach on a compact  tract. A larger building replaced the original structure on the same site in 2004. The school was first accredited in 1961. In the 1980s, the Palm Beach County School Board added the word Community to the names of all public high schools. Forest Hill is a public school for students in the local community, and for those coming from afar to the magnet programs held at the school.

Academics 
The school's attendance boundaries encompass a culturally diverse area with a high percentage of non-native speakers of English. In order to expand the opportunities available to its student body, the school initiated many magnet programs: Information Technology, International Baccalaureate, Environmental Science, Engineering, Tourism and Hospitality, Criminal Justice and Junior Reserve Officers' Training Corps. In 2008, the Tourism and Hospitality magnet program introduced a marketing club, DECA, into its program; and in 2009, the club opened up the school's first alternative breakfast cafe called Falcon Cafe, run by its members and officers.

The school also offers English for Speakers of Other Languages (ESOL) and Exceptional Student Education (ESE). The basic classes are: English, Math, Social Studies, Science, Foreign Language, Art, Physical Education, Culinary, and Woodwork.

Athletics 
 Football: Varsity & Junior Varsity Runner up  1986 & 1987 
 Football Cheerleading: Varsity & Junior Varsity
 Basketball Cheerleading: Varsity & Junior Varsity
 Swimming: Boys & Girls
 Boys Volleyball: Varsity & Junior Varsity
 Girls Volleyball: Varsity & Junior Varsity
 Bowling: Boys & Girls
 Tennis: Boys & Girls
 Baseball: Varsity & Junior Varsity
 Cross Country: Boys & Girls
 Track: Boys & Girls
 Softball
 Flag football
 Boys Soccer: Varsity & Junior Varsity
 Girls Soccer: Varsity & Junior Varsity
 Boys Basketball: Varsity & Junior Varsity
 Girls Basketball: Varsity & Junior Varsity
 Boys Wrestling: Varsity & Junior Varsity
 Girls Wrestling: Varsity & Junior Varsity

The school ended their 37-game football losing streak on October 23, 2009. The Varsity Falcons beat Spanish River 12-7. They had the longest losing streak in the state with 43 games from 1999-2003. The win was only fifth in the decade for Forest Hill. The game was won on Forest Hill's Senior night, the last home football game for the 2009-2010 season, except for the homecoming game, which was held on November 6, 2009.

School rating

Notable alumni 
 Stephanie Abrams, meteorologist who joined at The Weather Channel in 2003
 Ottis Anderson, National Football League player who earned Most Valuable Player honors at the 1991 Super Bowl (Class of 1975)
 Jeff Fischer, former Major League Baseball player (Montreal Expos, Los Angeles Dodgers) (Class of 1981)
 Eddie Gaillard, Major League Baseball player (Class of 1988)
 Jorge Labarga, Justice of the Florida Supreme Court
 Jarrod Jablonski, technical diver and record-setting cave diver (Class of 1987)
 J.P. Soars, blues singer, guitarist, songwriter and record producer. In 2021, he was nominated for a Blues Music Award in the 'Contemporary Blues Male Artist' category.
 Ken Stone, National Football League player (Class of 1968)
 Robby Thompson, Major League Baseball player (Class of 1980)
 Harry Winkler, University of Florida basketball player 1965-67, 1972 and 1976 US Olympic Handball player (Class of 1963)
 Mike Wood, former Major League Baseball player (Oakland Athletics, Kansas City Royals, Texas Rangers) (Class of 1998)

References

External links 
 Edline Page: Forest Hill Community High School
 FLDoE School Grade Report: Forest Hill Community High School 
 USGS Supported Engineering Academy @ FHCHS 
 IB Information: Forest Hill Community High School

Magnet schools in Florida
International Baccalaureate schools in Florida
High schools in Palm Beach County, Florida
Buildings and structures in West Palm Beach, Florida
Public high schools in Florida
1958 establishments in Florida
Educational institutions established in 1958